Rundēni parish is located in southwest Ludza District in Latvia. It borders on the Pildas, Nirza, Lauderu and Istras parishes of the Ludza District; the Škaunes and Ezernieku parishes of the Krāslava District; and the Kaunatas parish of Rezekne District. It is a distance of 33 km from the village of Rundēni at the parish centre up to District centre - Ludza. Up to Riga, the capital city of Latvia, it is 315 km.

Population and national structure 
In the Census of 2000, from a population of 800, there were 231 residents of Latvian nationality, 522 Russians, and 23 Belarusians.

Landscape

Rundēni parish is located on the height of Latgale. Most  of the parish is covered by the hills of Razna, and in the south-east by hills of Dagda. The highest part of Rundēni parish is the northern part, which forms a watershed between the rivers Daugava and Velikaya (basin of Lake Pskov). The western part of the parish is close to the massif of Lielais Liepukalns. The highest hills are Pentjušu Hill, and hills to the north at Kovaļiški, Sūnupļava and Rudzīši. The biggest lake is Lake Bižas. Smaller lakes include Bezersļesjes, Aunejas, Testečkovas, Kazeņa and Rudzīšu. The Saryanka River, a tributary of the Daugava, flows through the parish. Other small rivers of the parish are the Kazeņa, Siņica, Volčica, Vonogupīte.

Villages and populated places 
The centre of the parish is the village of Rundēni. Other populated places include:

 Adelinova 
 Barsuki
 Bezlesje
 Bļižņeva
 Bori
 Bojari
 Briževa
 Bubinova
 Čuhnova
 Dvorišče
 Devjatņiki
 Drozdovka
 Dzenegaļi
 Gorodoks
 Greidani
 Griņkova 
 Homutova 
 Kabilovka
 Kazeņa
 Kazici
 Kannova
 Kļeščeva
 Klumstova
 Kovaļiški
 Ksaverina
 Labunščina
 Lielā Maļinovka
 Lisova
 Loborži
 Losiški
 Mazkrinica
 Maļinovka 
 Mačuļi 
 Mežavēpri 
 Nalogi
 Noviņi
 Noviydvors
 Opši
 Osova
 Ostrova
 Pakalni
 Pentjuši
 Pereļji
 Pešleva
 Posiški
 Punculova
 Pušča
 Rocova
 Rudzīši
 Ruleva
 Rusecki
 Sarja
 Savina
 Stankeviči
 Strukaļi
 Sūnupļava
 Tarčilova
 Tartaks
 Tereneva
 Testečkova
 Škorlupova
 Yačmenišče
 Vertulova
 Zamostje
 Zarečje
 Zirgi
 Zubova
 Žubuļi

History 

Early in its history, the parish included the manors Rundēni, Viktorinavas un Bišu and smaller half-manors  Zuranpole, Čuhnova, and Lielā Kriņņica un Zaķu. During an agrarian reform, the manors were divided into land lots. The Pakalnu manor house is a private property, its architectural style is [[neo-romanticism]] and park of Rundēni manor. Until 1938 there were schools: in Ruleva, Drozdovka, Rudzīši, Pakalni, Vertulova and Rundēni. In 1939, the Rundēni secondary school was constructed. In 1920-1930, a rural community, some companies are formed: agricultural, credit-savings and cattle breeding. There were two flour mills, a dairy, twelve grocery shops, two bakeries, shop of wine and vodka, and also a shop and manufacturer and leather products. During the Soviet era, the state farm at Rundēni was the largest in Ludza District.

Showplaces

Places of worship 

The Roman Catholic Church of Christ's Ascension in Rundēni
The Orthodox Church of Birth of Our Lady in Vertulova
The Orthodox Old Believers’ Church Chapels: Bližņeva and Bori.

Protected archaeological and cultural monuments

Natural monuments 

The Bull-stone may have served to designate an ancient border. According to local legends, when the stone is touched it will take away ailments and give energy.

Since 1997, the Devil's Pits are a protected geomorphological object and are unique in the Baltic states. There are five pits of an unknown origin; one is filled with water and the others with raspberry bushes. The pits may have been caused by a meteorite or may be karstic formations.

Sculptural monuments and installations 

The Hill of Crosses
Memorial complex in Sūnupļava
The memorial ensemble was created in memory of eleven heroes of different nationalities from World War II, on Height of Sūnupļava (Height 144). It is on the side of the Rundēni-Lauderi road. The memorial ensemble is created from greater boulders (author A. Dripe).

References 

Parishes of Latvia
Ludza Municipality